The Golden Strain is a 1925 American silent Western film directed by Victor Schertzinger and written by Eve Unsell based upon a novel by Peter B. Kyne. The film stars Hobart Bosworth, Kenneth Harlan, Madge Bellamy, Lawford Davidson, Ann Pennington, and Frank Beal. The film was released on December 27, 1925, by Fox Film Corporation.

Plot
As described in a film magazine review, Lieutenant Milt Mulford, on being commissioned, joins a United States Army post located near his father's ranch. He falls in love with Dixie, the daughter of Major Denniston. Because Gaynes, government agent, is cheating the American Indians out of supplies, the Apaches go on the warpath. Milt heads a squadron that is sent out after them. Fear seizes the officer at the opening of a skirmish, and he fails to lead his men, and he is temporarily disgraced. Later, he redeems himself and regains command, and wins the affection of Dixie.

Cast

Preservation
A complete print of The Golden Strain is in the collection of the Museum of Modern Art.

References

External links

 
 
 Still at silenthollywood.com

1925 films
1925 Western (genre) films
Fox Film films
Films directed by Victor Schertzinger
American black-and-white films
Silent American Western (genre) films
1920s English-language films
1920s American films